Bettie James Gold Edition is the second studio album by American country music singer Jimmie Allen. It was released on June 25, 2021 via BBR Music Group. Prior to the album's release, seven songs from the album were released in 2020 as an extended play titled Bettie James. Both the extended play and full album are entirely composed of collaborations with country, contemporary R&B, and pop music artists. The extended play and album have accounted for two singles: "This Is Us" featuring Noah Cyrus, and "Freedom Was a Highway" featuring Brad Paisley.

Content
Bettie James was originally issued as a seven-song extended play on July 10, 2020. The album's name comes from Allen's father, James Allen, and grandmother, Bettie Snead. Allen co-produced the EP with Ash Bowers, and recorded every track as a duet. Collaborators include Tim McGraw, Darius Rucker, Mickey Guyton, Charley Pride, and The Oak Ridge Boys. The extended play's lead single was "This Is Us", a duet with Noah Cyrus.

In June 2021, BBR Music Group released Bettie James Gold Edition, which consists of all seven songs off the extended play plus nine more. Included in these was the project's second single, the Brad Paisley duet "Freedom Was a Highway". "Boy Gets a Truck" was previously recorded by Australian country singer Keith Urban on his 2016 album Ripcord. Further collaborators in the full album include Monica, Babyface, and Pitbull. In collaboration with the album, Allen also began a publishing company also called Bettie James, to which his bass guitarist Tate Howell has been signed.

Critical reception
Stephen Thomas Erlewine of AllMusic rated the extended play version three out of five stars, writing that "there are tips of the hat to his forefathers, a slight nod to hip-hop, some partying, a lot of ballads, and it's all unified by Allen's nimble navigating of the byways separating country, pop, and R&B." Matt Bjorke of Roughstock gave the full album a positive review, writing that "It might be an unexpected turn to make for an artist making only their second full-length album, but it is an unexpected turn that actually cements what I’ve thought of Jimmie Allen since I first got a chance to hear and see him play: The man is a superstar."

Bettie James (extended play) track listing

Bettie James Gold Edition track listing

References

2021 albums
BBR Music Group albums
Jimmie Allen albums
Vocal duet albums